The Cyprus Turkish Football Association (KTFF) is the governing body of football in the Turkish Republic of Northern Cyprus. Established on 29 October 1955, during British colonial rule in Cyprus, it was affiliated with the N.F.-Board from 2003 until the board's dissolution in 2013. Since 2013 the KTFF has been affiliated with the Confederation of Independent Football Associations.

League system

Süper Lig is the top division of the TRNC Football Federation.

The CTFA currently oversee the provision of 4 professional football leagues in the TRNC. The pyramid consists of the Süper Lig, 1. Lig, BTM 1. Lig and BTM 2. Lig (top division to lowest division).

The leaders of the KTFF 
List of presidents.

See also
 Sport in Northern Cyprus
 Cyprus Football Association

External links
  Official site

1955 establishments in Cyprus
Football federation
Association football governing bodies in Europe
Sports organizations established in 1955